Django, Prepare a Coffin (“Prepare the Coffin!”), alternatively titled Viva Django, is a 1968 Italian Spaghetti Western film directed by Ferdinando Baldi. The film stars Terence Hill in the title role, which was previously played by Franco Nero in Sergio Corbucci's original film. Django, Prepare a Coffin is unique among the plethora of films which capitalized on Corbucci's in that it is not only a semi-official, legitimate follow-up, but was also originally intended to star Nero.

A piece from the film's score, "Last Man Standing", was sampled in the song "Crazy" by American soul duo Gnarls Barkley. The film's title song, "You'd Better Smile", is performed by Nicola Di Bari.

It was shown as part of a retrospective on Spaghetti Western at the 64th Venice International Film Festival.

Cast

Terence Hill as Django
Horst Frank as David Barry
George Eastman as Lucas
José Torrès as Garcia Ibanez
Bruna Simionato (as Barbara Simon) as Mercedes Ibanez
Pinuccio Ardia as Horace (Orazio)
Guido Lollobrigida (as Lee Burton) as Jonathan Abbott
Spartaco Conversi as Django Gang Member
Luciano Rossi (as Edward G. Ross) as Yankee Jack
Gianni Brezza as Alvarez
Giovanni Ivan Scratuglia (as Ivan Scratuglia) as Pat O'Connor
Andrea Scotti as Lucas Henchman
Roberto Simmi as Wallace
Franco Balducci as Sheriff Jack
Adriana Giuffrè as Mrs. Yankee Jack
Lucio De Santis as Django Gang Member 
Angela Minervini as Lucy Cassidy
Giovanni Di Benedetto (as Gianni De Benedetto) as Walcott
Angelo Boscariol as Lucas Henchman 
Omero Capanna as Django Gang Member 
Remo De Angelis as Barry Henchman 
Franco Gulà as Deputy 
Paolo Magalotti as Lucas Henchman 
Eugene Walter as Spokesman

Plot
Django is wounded and his wife is killed when the gold transport that he guards is attacked by the men of his ”friend” David Barry, who wants the gold to finance a political career.

Django pretends to be dead and starts working as a hangman, who spares the lives of the condemned victims of David Barry's conspiracies. He organizes them in a band to ”haunt” the perjurers that sent them to the gallows. This is part of a plan to disclose Barry and bring him to justice. The ”hanged” are supposed to intercept an attack on a gold transport and capture Barry's men to get evidence, but Garcia - who earlier has saved Django's life during a fight within the group - convinces the rest of the men that instead they should take the gold for themselves. Garcia then kills the others.

Django saves Garcia's wife from hanging, and she then saves Django after Barry has captured him. Garcia regrets his treachery, which he explains by the fact that he is poor, and helps Django lure Barry to the graveyard, where Django digs up his own coffin and then kills Barry and his gang with the machine gun kept in the coffin. Garcia dies in the fight. Django leaves a sack of gold to Garcia's wife ”for you and the children” before he leaves.

Release
Django, Prepare a Coffin was released on 27 January 1968.

Reception
In his investigation of narrative structures in Spaghetti Western films, Fridlund suggests that though Django, Prepare a Coffin is basically a story of vindication and retribution, the relationship between Django and Garcia shows some affinity with the Gringo specialist/social bandit pair in "political" spaghetti westerns like The Mercenary.

Restoration
Django, Prepare a Coffin was restored at L'Immagine Ritrovata in Bologna. The film was transferred at 2K resolution with Arriscan from a 35mm interpositive print. Django, Prepare a Coffin was digitally restored in high definition and then digitally colour corrected with Film Master by Nucoda. The sound was digitalised using the Chace Optical Sound Precessor from the original soundtrack negative. The restored high definition edition of Django, Prepare a Coffin made its Blu-ray debut in June 2013 from the United Kingdom's Arrow Video.

References

External links

1968 films
Spaghetti Western films
1968 Western (genre) films
Django films
Films directed by Ferdinando Baldi
Films scored by Gianfranco Reverberi
1960s Italian films